Ekaterina Lutskevich (born 11 August 1982) is a Belarusian footballer who plays as a defender and has appeared for the Belarus women's national team.

Career
Lutskevich has been capped for the Belarus national team, appearing for the team during the 2019 FIFA Women's World Cup qualifying cycle.

References

External links
 
 
 

1982 births
Living people
Belarusian women's footballers
Belarus women's international footballers
Women's association football defenders
FC Minsk (women) players
Bobruichanka Bobruisk players